Glen Campbell Live is the first live album by American musician Glen Campbell, released in 1969 (see 1969 in music).  It features all of his hits up to that point, with the exceptions of the noticeably absent "Galveston" and "Wichita Lineman".

Track listing
Side 1:

 Medley:  "More / Somewhere"  (Riz Ortolani, Nino Oliviero/Leonard Bernstein, Stephen Sondheim)
 "White Lightning" (J. P. Richardson)
 "Didn't We" (Jimmy Webb)
 "Dreams of the Everyday Housewife" (Chris Gantry)
 "Gotta Travel On" (Paul Clayton)
 "(Sittin' On) The Dock of the Bay" (Steve Cropper, Otis Redding)
 "If You Go Away" (Jacques Brel, Rod McKuen)
 "Walk Right In" (Gus Cannon, Hosea Woods)
 "The Impossible Dream" (Mitch Leigh, Joe Darion)
 "Gentle on My Mind" (John Hartford)
 "Where's the Playground Susie" (Jimmy Webb)
 "Good Ole Mountain Dew" (Traditional; arranged by Glen Campbell)
 "You All Come" (Arlie Duff)
 "By the Time I Get to Phoenix" (Webb)
 "For Once in My Life" (Ron Miller, Orlando Murden)
 "It's Over" (Jimmie Rodgers)
 "Yakety Sax" (Boots Randolph, James Rich)
 "The Lord's Prayer" (Albert Hay Malotte)

Personnel
Glen Campbell – vocals, acoustic guitar, electric guitar
Bob Felts – drums
Billy Graham – bass guitar, harmony vocals
Al Casey – acoustic guitar
Dennis McCarthy – piano
The Garden State Arts Center Orchestra

Production
Producer – Al De Lory
Arranged by Al De Lory, Marty Paich, Dennis McCarthy
Conductor – Al De Lory
Engineers – Bob Arnold, Don Henderson, Joe Polito
Remastered in 2008 by Andrew Thompson/Sound Performance Studios, London, England

Charts
Album – Billboard (United States)

References

1969 live albums
Glen Campbell live albums
Capitol Records live albums
Albums arranged by Marty Paich